Tom Barbash is an American writer of fiction and nonfiction, as well as an educator and critic. He is the author of the novel The Last Good Chance, a collection of short stories Stay Up With Me, and the bestselling nonfiction work On Top of the World: Cantor Fitzgerald, Howard Lutnick & 9/11: A Story of Loss & Renewal. His fiction has been published in Tin House, Story magazine, The Virginia Quarterly Review and The Indiana Review. His criticism has appeared in the New York Times and the San Francisco Chronicle.

A well-regarded speaker, panelist, and interviewer, Barbash has served as host for onstage events for The Commonwealth Club, Litquake, BookPassage, and the Lannan Foundation, and his interview subjects have included Kazuo Ishiguro, Brett Easton Ellis, Jonathan Franzen, Carlos Ruiz Zafon, James Ellroy, Ann Packer, Mary Gaitskill, and Chuck Palahniuk.

He taught at Stanford University, where he was a Stegner Fellow, and now teaches novel writing, short fiction, and nonfiction, at the California College of the Arts. Barbash has held fellowships from the MacDowell Colony, Yaddo, The James Michener Foundation, and the National Endowment for the Arts. He lives in the San Francisco Bay Area.

Bibliography
The Last Good Chance: A Novel, Picador (2002) 
On Top of the World: Cantor Fitzgerald, Howard Lutnick, & 9/11: A Story of Loss & Renewal, Harper (2003) 
Stay Up With Me, Ecco (2013) 
The Dakota Winters, Ecco (2018)

Honors
Stegner Fellowship, Stanford University
 MacDowell Colony Fellow
California Book Award for First Fiction (2002)
James Michener Award (2002)
Nelson Algren Award for Short Fiction
Recipient, National Endowment of the Arts grant in fiction.

Personal life
Barbash was formerly a reporter for the Syracuse Post-Standard, an experience that helped to shape his novel The Last Good Chance, which is set in upstate New York. He is a member of the San Francisco Writers' Grotto, a workspace co-operative that also includes Po Bronson, Caroline Paul, Peter Orner, ZZ Packer, Vanessa Hua, Jason Roberts and B. Ruby Rich, among others.

References

External links
Interview with Paula Zahn on CNN.
 https://www.nytimes.com/2013/09/08/books/review/stay-up-with-me-by-tom-barbash.html

Year of birth missing (living people)
Living people
American male biographers
21st-century American novelists
Stegner Fellows
Writers from San Francisco
Stanford University Department of English faculty
Iowa Writers' Workshop alumni
Pacific Lutheran University faculty
American male novelists
American male short story writers
21st-century American biographers
21st-century American short story writers
21st-century American male writers
Novelists from Washington (state)